Bryan Lewis Allen (born October 13, 1952) is an American self-taught hang glider pilot and bicyclist. He achieved fame when he piloted (and provided the human power for) the two aircraft that won the first two Kremer prizes for human-powered flight: the Gossamer Condor (1977; the first human-powered aircraft that met the specified criteria of the first Kremer prize) and Gossamer Albatross (1979; the first human-powered aircraft to cross the English Channel). He later set world distance and duration records in a small pedal-powered blimp named "White Dwarf."

Biography
Allen graduated from Tulare Union High School in Tulare, California. He then attended the College of the Sequoias, and Cal State Bakersfield.

, he is employed by the Jet Propulsion Laboratory in Pasadena, California, working as a software engineer in the area of Mars exploration.

References

External links
"Martian" bio for Bryan Allen
Bryan Allen's home page

1952 births
Living people
NASA people
American aviation record holders